Salifo Caropitche Mendes (born 19 June 2001), sometimes known as just Salifo, is a Bissau-Guinean footballer who plays as a forward for Spanish club CD Mirandés B.

Early life
Born in the small village of Bafatá, Salifo moved abroad as a baby, staying in Dakar for a week before boarding on a plane towards the Canary Islands; they went on to live in Arrecife.

Club career
After beginning his career at CD Estefut, Salifo played for UD Lanzarote and Altavista CF before finishing his formation with CD Orientación Marítima. In 2020, he moved to Regional Preferente side CD Tahíche, and scored on a regular basis during the campaign.

On 23 July 2021, Salifo joined Segunda División RFEF side CD Mensajero. Roughly one year later, he signed a two-year contract with CD Mirandés, being initially assigned to the reserves in Tercera Federación.

Salifo made his professional debut with the Jabatos on 13 August 2022, coming on as a late substitute for Raúl García in a 1–1 Segunda División home draw against Sporting de Gijón.

References

External links

2001 births
Living people
People from Bafatá Region
Bissau-Guinean footballers
Association football forwards
Segunda División players
Segunda Federación players
Tercera Federación players
Divisiones Regionales de Fútbol players
CD Mensajero players
CD Mirandés B players
CD Mirandés footballers